Vera Ellery (10 August 1926 – 31 October 1998) was a British swimmer. She competed in the women's 100 metre backstroke at the 1948 Summer Olympics.

References

External links
 

1926 births
1998 deaths
British female swimmers
Olympic swimmers of Great Britain
Swimmers at the 1948 Summer Olympics
People from Croydon
Sportspeople from London
British female backstroke swimmers
20th-century British women